Emmanuel Libano Noruega (born 23 August 1983) is a footballer who currently plays for Liga de Elite club Chao Pak Kei. He is a defender who has been capped by the Macau national team.

References

External links
 
 

1983 births
Living people
Macau people of Indian descent
Macau footballers
Macau international footballers
G.D. Lam Pak players
Chao Pak Kei players
Association football defenders
Liga de Elite players